Tyler Jeffrey Hynes (born May 6, 1986) is a Canadian actor.

Early life
Hynes was born in Toronto, Ontario, but later grew up on a   ranch outside Ottawa. He began acting professionally at the age of eight.

Career
Hynes got his professional start at the age of eight during a 72-performance run of the musical stage production of A Christmas Carol as Tiny Tim, followed by a Canadian tour of The Who's rock opera Tommy, playing the role of 10-year-old Tommy. He followed this up with his first feature film, Little Men, starring Mariel Hemingway.

He portrayed Atreyu in 24 episodes of the TV series Tales from the Neverending Story and The Chosen One in the 24-episode run of Peter Benchley's Amazon. Tyler was nominated "Fan Favourite"  at Canada's Gemini Awards at age 15. He later starred in Tagged: The Jonathan Wamback Story.

Filmography

 Lassie (1997) TV Series - Darren
 Little Men (1998) - Demi Brooke
 Home Team (1998) - Chip
 Peter Benchley's Amazon (1999) TV Series - Will Bauer
 Soldier of Fortune (1999) - Billy Riddle
 The Mystery Files of Shelby Woo (1999) Gary Epps
 Are You Afraid of the Dark? (1999) (TV) - Jimmy Miller
 The Other Me (2000) (TV) - Scottie DeSota
 Tagged: The Jonathan Wamback Story (2001) (TV) - Jonathan Wamback
 Tales from the Neverending Story (2001-2002)(24 Episodes) - Atreyu
 Terrorized by Teens (2002) Jonathon
 Levity (2003) - Ripple
 Tales From the Neverending Story (2003) four TV movies - Atreyu
 While I Was Gone (2004) (TV) - Malky McDowell
 The Last Sign (2005) - Frank
 I Do, They Don't (2005) (TV) - Rusty
 Mom at Sixteen (2005) (TV) - Brad
 15/Love (2005-2006) (TV) - Nate Bates
 Citizen Duane (2006) (Film) - Rebel Stoner
 Camille (2007) (Film) - Ricky
 Sophie (2008-2009)  (TV) - Christian
 Flashpoint (2008) (TV) - R. J. Strachan
 Warehouse 13 (2009-2012) (TV Series) - Joshua
 Valemont (2009) - Gabriel
 Impossible   (2010) - Ian French
 Heartland (2010-2012) - Joe
 Immortals (2011)
 The Firm (2011-2012) TV series - Patrick Walker
 NCIS TV Series (2011) Devin Lodge 
 Firefly (2012) actor, director
 The Listener (2012) TV series - Kurt Marker
 Betty & Coretta (2013) - Mike Fitzpatrick
 A String To Pull (2013) Short
 Saving Hope (2013–2014) - Luke Reid
   19-2- TV series (2013–2015) - Vince Legare
   Rookie Blue (2013) TV series - Von
   Transporter (2014) TV series - Zac Preston
   AFK (2015) short movie - Cyrus; writer, director
   Len and Company (2015) - Paul
 The Girlfriend Experience (2016) (TV) - Greg
   Serialized TV Movie (2016) - Jason Ryan
   Mechanics of Love (2017) - Jake Henderson
   Flatliners (2017) film
   Deadly Double TV Movie (2017) - Alex Cosgrove
   Falling For You (2018) - Zac Malone
   Unreal (2017–2018) TV series - Billy Byrd
   It's Christmas, Eve  (2018) - Liam Bailey
   Flip that Romance (2019) - Lance Waddell
   Star Trek: Discovery (2019) TV series - Stephen 
   The Mistletoe Secret (2019) TV - Alex Bartlett
   My Boyfriend's Back: Wedding March 5 (2019) - Brad
 Letterkenny (2019–2021) - Dierks
   Recon (2019) - Sargent Reese
   Home and Family (2019–2020)
   Winter in Vail (2020) - Owen Becker
   Hotwired in Suburbia TV movie (2020) - Curnow
   On the 12th Date of Christmas (2020) -  Aidan Welch
   It Was Always You (2021) - David Belling
   Sweet Carolina (2021) - Cooper
   Roadhouse Romance (2021) - Luke Ellis
   My Christmas Family Tree (2021) - waiter
   An Unexpected Christmas (2021) - Jamie
   Always Amore (2022) - Ben Elliott
 Three Wise Men and a Baby (2022)
   A Time for Him to Come Home for Christmas (2022)
 A Picture of Her (2023)

Awards and nominations

References

External links 

1986 births
Living people
Canadian male film actors
Canadian male television actors
Canadian male child actors
Male actors from Toronto
People from the United Counties of Prescott and Russell
20th-century Canadian male actors
21st-century Canadian male actors